The men's sprint at the 2004 Summer Olympics (Cycling) was an event that consisted of cyclists making three laps around the track. Only the time for the last 200 metres of the 750 metres covered was counted as official time. There were 19 competitors from 13 nations, with each nation limited to two cyclists. The event was won by Ryan Bayley of Australia, the nation's first victory in the men's sprint after three times coming in second (most recently in 1992). Theo Bos of the Netherlands took silver, the Dutch team's first medal in the event since 1936. René Wolff earned bronze, stretching Germany's podium streak to four Games (five if East Germany is included; cyclists from eastern Germany had been on the podium in the event every Games since 1976 except the boycotted 1984 Games).

Australian Ryan Bayley defeated current world champion, Theo Bos from the Netherlands, when the sprinting gold medal was taken to a third decider race. In the race for the bronze René Wolff from Germany defeated Laurent Gané from France.

Background

This was the 23rd appearance of the event, which has been held at every Summer Olympics except 1904 and 1912. Three of the quarterfinalists from 2000 returned: fourth-place finisher Laurent Gané of France, sixth-place finisher José Antonio Villanueva of Spain, and seventh-place finisher Sean Eadie of Australia. Three recent world champions were competing: Gané (2003, also runner-up in 2000, 2001, and 2004), Eadie (2002), and Theo Bos of the Netherlands (2004). René Wolff of Germany and Ryan Bayley of Australia were also significant contenders, each having reached the podium at world championships.

For the second consecutive Games, no nations made their debut in the men's sprint. France made its 23rd appearance, the only nation to have competed at every appearance of the event.

Competition format

This sprint competition involved a series of head-to-head matches along with the new qualifying round of time trials. There were five main match rounds, with two one-round repechages.

 Qualifying round: Each of the 19 competitors completed a 200-metre flying time trial (reaching full speed before timing started for the last 200 metres). The top 18 advanced to the match rounds, seeded based on their time in the qualifying round. With only 19 riders starting, only the slowest cyclist was eliminated; however, one of the qualified riders withdrew, and the 19th-placed rider moved up to 18th and qualified.
 Round 1: The 18 cyclists were seeded into 9 heats of 2 cyclists each. The winner of each heat advanced to the 1/8 finals (9 cyclists) while the other cyclists went to the first repechage (9 cyclists).
 First repechage: The 9 cyclists were divided into 3 heats, each with 3 cyclists. The winner of each heat advanced to the 1/8 finals (3 cyclists) while the losers were eliminated (6 cyclists).
 1/8 finals: The 12 remaining cyclists competed in a 1/8 finals round. There were 6 heats in this round, with 2 cyclists in each. The winner in each heat advanced to the quarterfinals (6 cyclists), while the loser in each heat went to the second repechage (6 cyclists).
 Second repechage: This round featured 2 heats, with 3 cyclists each. The winner of each heat advanced to the quarterfinals (2 cyclists); the losers competed in a ninth-twelfth classification race.
 Quarterfinals: Beginning with the quarterfinals, all matches were one-on-one competitions and were held in best-of-three format. There were 4 quarterfinals, with the winner of each advancing to the semifinals and the loser going to the fifth-eighth classification race.
 Semifinals: The two semifinals provided for advancement to the gold medal final for winners and to the bronze medal final for losers.
 Finals: Both a gold medal final and a bronze medal final were held, as well as a classification final for fifth through eighth places for quarterfinal losers.

Records

The records for the sprint are 200 metre flying time trial records, kept for the qualifying round in later Games as well as for the finish of races.

No new world or Olympic records were set during the competition.

Schedule

All times are Greece Standard Time (UTC+2)

Results

Qualifying round

Times and average speeds are listed. Q denotes qualification for the next round.

After Tomohiro Nagatsuka dropped out of competition following the round, all of the cyclists following him advanced one position. This allowed Stefan Nimke to compete in the first round despite having originally placed 19th.

Round 1

The first round consisted of nine heats of two riders each. Winners advanced to the next round, losers competed in the 1/16 repechage.

Heat 1

Heat 2

Heat 3

Heat 4

Heat 5

Heat 6

Heat 7

Heat 8

Heat 9

First repechage

The nine defeated cyclists from the 1/16 round took part in the 1/16 repechage. They raced in three heats of three riders each. The winner of each heat rejoined the nine victors of the 1/16 round in advancing to the 1/8 round

First repechage heat 1

First repechage heat 2

First repechage heat 3

1/8 finals

The 1/8 round consisted of six matches, each pitting two of the twelve remaining cyclists against each other. The winners advanced to the quarterfinals, with the losers getting another chance in the 1/8 repechage.

1/8 final 1

1/8 final 2

1/8 final 3

1/8 final 4

1/8 final 5

1/8 final 6

Second repechage

The six cyclists defeated in the 1/8 round competed in the 1/8 repechage. Two heats of three riders were held. Winners rejoined the victors from the 1/8 round and advanced to the quarterfinals. The four other riders competed in the 9th through 12th place classification.

Second repechage heat 1

Second repechage heat 2

Quarterfinals

The eight riders that had advanced to the quarterfinals competed pairwise in four matches. Each match consisted of two races, with a potential third race being used as a tie-breaker if each cyclist won one of the first two races. All four quarterfinals matches were decided without a third race. Winners advanced to the semifinals, losers competed in a 5th to 8th place classification.

Quarterfinal 1

Quarterfinal 2

Quarterfinal 3

Quarterfinal 4

Semifinals

The four riders that had advanced to the semifinals competed pairwise in two matches. Each match consisted of two races, with a potential third race being used as a tie-breaker if each cyclist won one of the first two races. Both semifinals matches were decided without a third race. Winners advanced to the finals, losers competed in the bronze medal match.

Semifinal 1

Semifinal 2

Finals

Classification 9-12

The 9-12 classification was a single race with all four riders that had lost in the 1/8 repechage taking place. The winner of the race received 9th place, with the others taking the three following places in order.

Classification 5-8

The 5-8 classification was a single race with all four riders that had lost in the quarterfinals taking place. The winner of the race received 5th place, with the others taking the three following places in order.

Bronze medal match

The bronze medal match was contested in a set of three races, with the winner of two races declared the winner. Since René Wolff won both of the first two races, the third was not run.

Final

The final was a best-of-three match. Bos took a lead in the series when he won the first race, but Bayley defeated him in the second race. The third race was decisive and Bayley came out on top again.

Final classification

References

External links
Official Olympic Report

M
Cycling at the Summer Olympics – Men's sprint
Track cycling at the 2004 Summer Olympics
Men's events at the 2004 Summer Olympics